Diego Álvarez and Carles Poch-Gradin were the defending champions, but they chose not to participate this year.
Pere Riba and Santiago Ventura won in the final 6–2, 6–2, against Marcelo Demoliner and Rodrigo Guidolin.

Seeds

  Jonathan Marray /  Jamie Murray (quarterfinals)
  David Marrero /  Rubén Ramírez Hidalgo (first round)
  Pere Riba /  Santiago Ventura (champions)
  Marcelo Demoliner /  Rodrigo Guidolin (final)

Draw

Draw

External links
Main Draw

Seguros Bolivar Open Bucaramanga - Doubles
2010 Doubles